Peter Taaffe (born April 1942) is a British Marxist (Trotskyist) political activist and journalist. He was the general secretary of the Socialist Party of England and Wales from its founding until 2020 and was a member of the International Executive Committee of the Committee for a Workers' International (CWI).

Taaffe was the founding editor of the Trotskyist Militant newspaper in 1964, and became known as a leading member of the entryist Militant group. Taaffe was expelled from the Labour Party in 1983, along with four other members of Militant'''s editorial board

Taaffe was influential in the policy decisions of Liverpool City Council of 1983–1987, according to the council's deputy leader Derek Hatton, in the formation of the Militant tendency's policy regarding the Poll Tax in 1988–1991, and the Militant tendency's "open turn" from the Labour Party in the late 1980s, becoming general secretary of Militant's eventual successor, the Socialist Party in 1997. He retired as general secretary after the party's February 2020 congress but remains on the party's executive committee as political secretary.

 Early life 
Born in Birkenhead, Cheshire, one of six children of a sheet metal worker, Taaffe first joined the Campaign for Nuclear Disarmament, before joining the Labour Party where he was attracted to the radical element in the Liverpool Labour Party. In an interview for the BBC Radio 4 programme The Party's Over, Taaffe gave a few biographical details:

"I came into contact with Socialist Fight in 1960" writes Taaffe. Socialist Fight was the newspaper of a small group of mainly (but not entirely) industrial militants in Liverpool going by the name of the Revolutionary Socialist League (RSL), and led by Jimmy Deane and Ted Grant.

Taaffe "does not subscribe to the view that the struggles of small groupings are of no historical significance". This small group supported the ideas of Leon Trotsky, who proposed that genuine Marxism, followed by Lenin, had always argued that only the working class in the advanced capitalist countries could lead a revolution to establish socialism. These were the ideas to which Taaffe subscribed.

Taaffe argues that, "There is a long tradition going right back to the 1930s and Trotsky himself, of Trotskyist groups and organisations which endeavoured to find a base within the labour movement and working class."

 Peter Taaffe and the Militant newspaper 
In 1964, Taaffe writes that the "youth supporters of Militant" drew on their experiences gained during the 1960 Clydeside apprentices' strike in "seeking to organise and mobilise the Liverpool apprentices. Ted Mooney and I played leading roles, together with Harry Dowling and Dave Galashan, in organising an apprentices' strike in one factory, English Electric, on the East Lancashire Road." About 20,000 of the 70,000 engineering apprentices downed tools in total. By this time, the second issue of the Militant had come out.

Earlier in 1964, Ted Grant, Liverpudlians Jimmy Deane (who was National Secretary) and Keith Dickenson, Ellis Hillman, John Smith, and others on the executive of the RSL decided to launch the Militant newspaper "without complete unanimity" Taaffe writes.

Peter Taaffe, who lived in Liverpool at that time, was appointed editor. He recalled this time in the Radio 4 programme, The Party's Over:

In 1965, Taaffe was able to move to London. He became full-time national secretary as well as editor of Militant, despite a serious shortage of money: "I was compelled first of all to sleep on the floor of a supporter in Balham... once or twice spending sleepless nights in the entrances of subways". Eventually, the group became known by the name of the paper, and was either referred to as Militant or the Militant tendency.

Many of Peter Taaffe's major signed articles in Militant during the first few years were on international topics: the Congo, Dominica, Latin America, Vietnam, Rhodesia, and China. In Issue 16, in May 1966, perhaps to coincide with the international working class celebrations on May Day, Taaffe's article led the front page with the banner headline 'Internationalism the Only Road'.

In September 1965, Militant, in issue no.9, ran a front-page article by Taaffe under the banner headline: "Nationalise the 400 Monopolies". This was the first instance of Militant's demand for the nationalisation of usually a specific number of multinational companies, which were said to control 80% or more of the economy, under workers' control and management, and the establishment of a socialist plan of production. Demands of this nature in Militant follow the Transitional Program written by Leon Trotsky, pushing beyond what the "bourgeois state" was willing to concede.

 Expulsion from the Labour Party 
By the 1980s, the Militant tendency had become the most prominent Trotskyist organisation in Britain. Two books by Peter Taaffe: The Rise of Militant and Liverpool – A City That Dared to Fight (with Tony Mulhearn) describe this period. The Labour Party under Michael Foot (and later Neil Kinnock) moved to purge Militant from the party. In 1983, Peter Taaffe, along with the other four members of the Militant newspaper's editorial board (Ted Grant, Keith Dickinson, Lynn Walsh, and Clare Doyle), were expelled from the Labour Party.

A year later, speaking at the Wembley Conference Centre to several thousand supporters celebrating 20 years of the Militant newspaper, Taaffe highlighted the media attention now fixed on Militant. Speaking about a "marvellous article" in the Daily Mirror, by now under the ownership of Robert Maxwell, he said:

His speech contrasted on the one hand the determination showed by strikers during the miners strike in 1984–1985, and the Liverpool victory of the previous year under the leadership of the Militant tendency, and on the other the "five years of defeats" inflicted on workers as a result of poor Labour and trade union leadership.

Taaffe characterised Neil Kinnock, Labour leader from 1983, in this way: "The bourgeois recognized early that Kinnock's role in attacking Liverpool and the miners was an attempt to sanitise the Labour Party, ridding it of all that 'socialist nonsense'." Taaffe went on to predict "an enormous recoil towards the left" within the Labour Party. But this prognosis was overtaken by the profound changes which took place in the Labour Party.

In 1988, Taaffe began assessing with the Scottish Militant members the prospects of activism against the government's Poll tax (officially the Community Charge) legislation. But for Taaffe and the leadership of the Militant, the prospects for Militant in the Labour Party were poor.

 The Liverpool struggle 1983–1987 
In the four-year Liverpool struggle, Taaffe was closely involved with developments, discussing with close friends and leading Liverpool Militant supporters, such as the former print worker Tony Mulhearn. He was President of the Liverpool District Labour Party during these events, in which the Liverpool City Council declared it was "Better to break the law than break the poor", agreed an illegal budget, and built 4,800 houses and bungalows, and improved 7,400 houses and flats (amongst other works), before the 47 councillors were surcharged and removed from office . Their opponents however argued that Liverpool was in chaos.

Taaffe wanted to take the Liverpool battle towards a split with the Labour Party at that stage. In the interview for the BBC Radio 4 programme The Party's Over, Taaffe makes the following remarks:

The Liverpool District Labour Party, which Taaffe says in the same interview had a very large attendance of 700, was suspended by the Labour Party in 1986. Thus Taaffe here indicates that he argued for defying the ban, which would have been in all essentials a split from the Labour Party.

 The Poll Tax 1989–1991 
In Glasgow, in April 1988, a "one-day conference with delegates from every area of Scotland where Militant had supporters and influence", was held with Taaffe present. This conference decided to adopt the tactic of mass non-payment of the Poll Tax, and the "building of a Scottish-wide network of local anti-poll tax unions and regional federations" – a strategy which was clearly in tune with large swathes of the population. In fact Prime Minister John Major subsequently reported that 17.5 million people had either not paid or were in serious arrears just before abolishing it.

Anti-Poll Tax Unions were set up around the country, and brought together on an all-Scotland and then an all-Britain basis. These bodies, which brought Tommy Sheridan to prominence and are described in n Taaffe's 'The Rise of Militant', had to be built outside, and essentially in opposition to the Labour Party, which was implementing the Poll Tax at local level.

"The august Times (11 July 1984) thundered: 'Danegeld in Liverpool'.", writes Peter Taaffe in Liverpool – A City That Dared to Fight, chapter 8, p. 151 . The Poll Tax non-payment campaign has been widely credited for causing British Prime Minister Margaret Thatcher's downfall. The BBC, for instance, reports: "The unpopularity of the new charge led to the poll tax riots in London in March 1990 and – indirectly – to the downfall of the then Prime Minister Margaret Thatcher in the November of the same year". The headline of this 'On this day' retrospective is "1990: One in five yet to pay poll tax"  (See also Poll Tax Riots.) Peter Taaffe argues that:

 The Open Turn 
From 1987, differences between Taaffe and others on the executive committee of Militant and the CWI, and Grant and his supporters became apparent.

The decisive issue between the two sides arose in 1991. It centred on whether the group should take an "open turn", initially called the "Scottish turn", which meant founding an independent political party outside of the Labour Party, or whether it should continue with entryism. Taaffe and the majority in Militant supported the Scottish turn and the creation of Scottish Militant Labour whilst Grant and a minority opposed it. These became known as the 'Majority' and the 'Minority' positions, and both produced documents which were circulated.

The "Open Turn" debate took place essentially between April and October 1991. In April 1991, the Militant executive body decided to support the "Scottish Turn" as it was initially termed. In January 1992, the majority leadership claimed that the minority was intending to split from Militant. Peter Taaffe published an extended editorial in Militant (24 January 1992) entitled "A parting of the ways" which announced that following the "Scottish turn" decision at the special conference in October 1991, Tommy Sheridan would be the group's Glasgow Pollock candidate in the approaching general election.

Taaffe stated that those ten months had been one of "profound debate" culminating in the special October 1991 in which the majority had overwhelming support. Many opponents of the "Scottish turn" will remain loyal supporters of Militant, Taaffe predicted. Immediately after the special conference, Taaffe stated that Ted Grant and his group took steps to set up "their own small premises and their own staff and are raising their own funds. We regret Ted Grant has split in this way. He made a vital contribution..."

Grant, Alan Woods, Rob Sewell, and other leading supporters of the 'Minority' were expelled, and reconstituted themselves as the Socialist Appeal tendency, after its paper, and Scottish Militant Labour eventually became the Scottish Socialist Party (SSP).

 "A parting of the ways" 
In the Militant editorial and in the document "Two Trends: Political Roots of The Breakaway" in January 1992, and in his book about Militant, Taaffe identified other issues which had become problematic. Political disagreements within the group existed over Black Monday, Russia, Afghanistan and South Africa). Taaffe accused Grant of "never [being] prepared to enter into a dialogue. Ted effectively claimed a right of political veto" over the executive committee of the Militant. For Taaffe, there was a difference of views over the achievements of the last ten years. "They [Grant and his supporters] claim that over the last ten years Militant has relegated theory and moved towards activism. Incredibly, they dismiss as "activism" the outstanding interventions of Militant supporters in the miner's strike and the Liverpool council battle...Above all they relegate our successful leadership of the anti-poll tax movement which defeated Thatcher." On the contrary, counters Taaffe, it is Grant and his followers who have fallen into "dogmatism" and betray an atrophy of thought: "The former minority are political dinosaurs. They operate with outmoded formulas which no longer apply... an absolutely dogmatic, black and white, undialectical approach towards political phenomena, both in Britain and on an international scale.". He claimed that Grant "publicly asserted his views against the majority of the editorial board on crucial issues, [which] threatened to have a disorientating effect on some of our supporters".

One disagreement over current events was over 'Black Monday' – a sharp fall in the international stock markets in 1987. Grant believed a worldwide slump would arise from the fall of the stock markets. "From a capitalist point of view at best this will be the worst post-war slump, but it is possible that it will be worse than the slump of 1929–1933". Whilst Grant had the support of Alan Woods and Michael Roberts on this issue, he was opposed by Taaffe, Lynn Walsh, Bob Labi and what was to become the "majority". Here was first clearly delineated the dividing line that was drawn between the supporters of Grant and Taaffe. Taaffe writes that the discussion on the executive was "very sharp".

Taaffe argued that, "To other members of the Editorial Board it was clear that the major capitalist states, especially Germany and Japan, were stepping in to finance a stabilisation of the world financial system. This, we argued, would allow the boom to continue for a time, postponing a recession and other problems into the future. This was what happened." Despite the disagreements, Grant proceeded to publish his views in the Militant. Looking back in 1992 Taaffe argues that Grant should have been challenged in writing. Such a challenge would have meant the formation of factions in 1987.

A final issue was the approaching collapse of the Soviet Union, or for them, the crisis of Stalinism. Taaffe and the majority believed that the restoration of capitalism was possible in the Soviet Union. Grant disagreed. In fact in the same article on "Black Monday" Grant added his view that, "Any illusions in Gorbachev changing anything fundamental, will be shattered by the attitude of the Moscow bureaucracy to this crisis." The collapse of Stalinism was, Taaffe counters, "the end of an epoch", which led to capitalist triumphalism.

 The Socialist Party 
The majority in the Militant tendency, led by Peter Taaffe, argued that the Labour Party had become a thoroughly bourgeois party which no longer represented the working class. Militant went on to become Militant Labour and then the Socialist Party in 1997, with Taaffe as general secretary. It campaigns in the trade unions to break the link with Labour and found a new party based on the working class, in contrast to the supporters of Socialist Appeal, who support a policy of work within the Labour Party and the trade unions in opposition to New Labour under Tony Blair.

Internationally, Taaffe won majority support in the Committee for a Workers' International (CWI). The opposition to the Open Turn internationally was expelled from the CWI and founded the Committee for a Marxist International and its in Defence of Marxism website. The CWI later founded a website Marxist resource from the Committee for a Workers' International in part to publish the documents written by Peter Taaffe and others in the CWI about these and other developments and debates, as a contribution to an analysis of what they perceive to be the complexities of the current period, and how to build the path to the working class for the ideas of Marxism.

Taaffe continued to play an important role in the Committee for a Workers' International, writing books and pamphlets such as the History of the CWI, Afghanistan, Islam and the Revolutionary Left (2002) and on the anniversary of the British general strike, 1926 General Strike – workers taste power (2006).

Taaffe's Marxism in Today's World (2006) arose from a visit to the CWI's offices in London by an Italian Marxist publishing collective, Guiovane Talpa, who conducted a probing interview with Peter Taaffe and Bob Labi on CWI policy over several days, publishing the transcript in Italian. At the completion of the project the CWI published an additional English version. This book discusses the views of the CWI on war, capitalism the environment and other issues, and is now being published in India.

In November 2016, Taaffe publicly applied to rejoin the Labour Party as part of a group of 75 activists. With the aim of supporting party leader Jeremy Corbyn against his internal opponents, his objective was for Labour Party affiliation of the Socialist Party and the standing of joint candidates.

Following the 2020 national congress of the Socialist Party, the newly elected Socialist Party Executive Committee unanimously agreed that deputy general secretary Hannah Sell take over as general secretary from Peter Taaffe. He was elected political secretary and remains on the Executive Committee.

 Publications 
Taaffe has written a number of books and pamphlets, including:Socialism and Left Unity, (2008)Marxism in Today's World, (2006)1926 General Strike – workers taste power, (April 2006)Upheavals in China (pamphlet), (April 2005).A socialist world is possible, (February 2005)Empire Defeated: Vietnam War – The Lessons For Today, (2003)Post-September 11: Can US Imperialism be challenged? (booklet), (September 2002) One of the CWI world conference documentsAfghanistan, Islam and the Revolutionary Left (pamphlet), (February 2002)Cuba: Socialism and Democracy – Debates on the Revolution and Cuba Today, (2000)Global Turmoil (CWI world conference document 1998) Joint production of the CWI international secretariatThe History of the CWI (pamphlet), (1997)The Rise of Militant: Militant's 30 years, (1995)A world in crisis (CWI world conference document 1994) Joint production of the CWI international secretariatThe Masses Arise: The Great French Revolution, 1789–1815, (1989)Liverpool – A city that Dared to Fight'', with Tony Mulhearn (1988)

References

External links 
Socialist Party (England & Wales) website
Committee for a Workers' International website
Marxist resource from the Committee for a Workers' International
History of British Trotskyism By Ted Grant
Militant's Real History: In reply to Ted Grant and Rob Sewell by Peter Taaffe (this is a reply to Ted Grant's History of British Trotskyism and Rob Sewell's Postscript to it)

1942 births
Living people
British anti–nuclear weapons activists
British Marxists
British political writers
British Trotskyists
Committee for a Workers' International
British Marxist writers
Militant tendency supporters
People from Birkenhead
Socialist Party (England and Wales) members